Henri Woodrau Crockett (born October 28, 1974) is a former American football player. He attended Blanche Ely High School in Pompano Beach, FL.  As a youth Henri was recognized as an All-American Athlete in Parade Magazine’s Super Prep and Football Report. He earned an athletic scholarship and played linebacker at Florida State University.  Henri was a member of the Seminole’s 1993 NCAA Division I National Championship team and was also part of the team that won five back to back Atlantic Coast Conference Championships from 1993–1997.  After graduating from college with a Bachelor of Arts in Criminology he was drafted by the Atlanta Falcons in the 4th round of the 1997 NFL Draft.  He started in Super Bowl XXXIII in 1999 with the Falcons, where they were defeated by the Denver  Broncos.  In 2002 Henri was traded to the Minnesota Vikings. His brother, Zack Crockett, played fullback with the Oakland Raiders.

Crockett is a member of Omega Psi Phi fraternity.

After football
Crockett has become an entrepreneur and businessman since leaving the NFL.  He is the President/CEO of South Florida Development & Investment Company, President/CEO Guaranteed Enterprise Trucking services and owner and operator of Vanity Salon.

References

1974 births
Living people
American football linebackers
Atlanta Falcons players
Blanche Ely High School alumni
Florida State Seminoles football players
Minnesota Vikings players
People from Pompano Beach, Florida
Players of American football from Florida
Sportspeople from Broward County, Florida